In algebra, an analytically normal ring is a local ring whose completion is a normal ring, in other words a domain that is integrally closed in its quotient field.

 proved that if a local ring of an algebraic variety is normal, then it is analytically normal, which is in some sense a variation of Zariski's main theorem.  gave an example of a normal Noetherian local ring that is analytically reducible and therefore not analytically normal.

References 

 

 
 

Commutative algebra